Saint Maria Goretti Parish is a territorial parish of the Roman Catholic Diocese of San Jose in California. The parish was formed in July 1961 from orchards off Senter Road near Capitol Expressway. The parish was created while still part of the Archdiocese of San Francisco, prior to the founding of the Diocese of San Jose in 1981. This occurred during the tenure of Most Rev. Joseph McGucken, Archbishop of San Francisco, to serve Catholics of San Jose. The parish is named for St Maria Goretti an Italian virgin martyr saint of the 19th and early 20th century.

Parish history
The church building that stands today was dedicated on March 3, 1963.

Succession of priests

Parish website
The parish website has been hosted under several domains through the years including http://www.smgsj.org/

References

Roman Catholic Diocese of San Jose in California
Athanasius
Christian organizations established in 1969
Churches in Santa Clara County, California